Lophotoma is a genus of moths of the family Erebidae. The genus was described by Turner in 1902.

Species
Lophotoma diagrapha Turner, 1902
Lophotoma metabula Turner, 1902

References

Calpinae
Moth genera